The Glory Stompers is a 1967 outlaw biker film.

Plot
After a standoff between two biker gangs in California, members of the Black Souls, led by the vicious and unstable Chino (Dennis Hopper) ambush Darryl (Jody McCrea), leader of the Glory Stompers, and beat him severely. Thinking they've killed Darryl, the Black Souls kidnap his girlfriend (Chris Noel) to prevent her from becoming a witness against them. They decide to traffic her in Mexico and head south for the border, unaware that Darryl has recovered and is in pursuit.

Cast

Dennis Hopper   ... 	Chino

Jody McCrea     ... 	Darryl

Chris Noel 	    ... 	Chris

Jock Mahoney    ... 	Smiley

Lindsay Crosby  ... 	Monk

Casey Kasem     ... 	Mouth

Jim Reader 	    ... 	Paul

Sandra Bettin   ... 	Jo Ann (as Saundra Gayle)

Robert Tessier  ... 	Magoo

Astrid Warner 	... 	Doreen

Gary Wood  	    ... 	Pony

External links
 
 
 

1967 films
Outlaw biker films
1960s action films
American action films
1960s English-language films
1960s American films